Quill Lakes was a constituency of the Legislative Assembly of Saskatchewan.

Geography 
The district was based in the Quill Lakes area of Saskatchewan.

Representation 

 Murray James Koskie (1975 to 1995)

References 

Former provincial electoral districts of Saskatchewan